Kulykiv is an urban-type settlement in Lviv Raion of Lviv Oblast in Ukraine. Kulykiv hosts the administration of Kulykiv settlement hromada, one of the hromadas of Ukraine. A Ukrainian star actor of Taras Bulba and other films and stage performances in Kyiv Ivan Franko theater Bohdan Stupka was born there . Population: 

Until 18 July 2020, Kulykiv belonged to Zhovkva Raion. The raion was abolished in July 2020 as part of the administrative reform of Ukraine, which reduced the number of raions of Lviv Oblast to seven. The area of Zhovkva Raion was merged into Lviv Raion.

Economy

Transportation
It is on the railway connecting Lviv via Zhovkva with Rava-Ruska. There is infrequent passenger traffic.

The settlement is on Highway M09 which connects Lviv with Rava-Ruska, crosses into Poland and continues to Zamość.

References

Urban-type settlements in Lviv Raion